Dario Faini, also known as Dardust or DRD, is an Italian songwriter, record producer and pianist.
He composed songs for several recording artists, including Marco Mengoni, Francesco Renga, Emma, Annalisa, Thegiornalisti, Giusy Ferreri, Levante, Elodie, Fabri Fibra, Ermal Meta and Rancore.

In 2019, he co-wrote the song "Soldi", also produced by Faini with Charlie Charles, which won the 69th Sanremo Music Festival. Faini also conducted the orchestra during Mahmood's performance. After placing second in the Eurovision Song Contest 2019, "Soldi" also became a hit in Europe.

During his career, he also released a trilogy of instrumental albums, composed of 7 (2015), Birth (2016) and S.A.D. Storms and Drugs. As a lead artist, he released the hit singles "Calipso" (2019), produced with Charlie Charles and performed by Mahmood, Fabri Fibra and Sfera Ebbasta, and "Defuera" (2020), with vocals by Ghali, Marracash and Madame. He performed in the first semi-final of the Eurovision Song Contest 2022 in Turin as an interval act alongside Benny Benassi and Sophie and the Giants.

Discography

Studio albums
 7 (2015)
 Birth (2016)
 Slow Is (2017)
 S.A.D. Storm and Drugs (2020)
 Duality (2022)

EPs
 7 Remixed (2015)
 The New Loud (2017)
 S.A.D. (Piano Solo) (2020)
 001 Coordinate (2022)
 002 Hymns (2022)
 003 Horizons (2022)
 004 Fluidity (2022)

References

External links
 
 
 
 

1976 births
People from Ascoli Piceno
Italian record producers
Italian songwriters
Living people